Le désordre et la nuit (French for "The Disorder and the Night") is a 1958 French crime film directed by Gilles Grangier and starring Jean Gabin and Danielle Darrieux. The screenplay is based on the novel Le Désordre et la Nuit by Jacques Robert. The film was released in the United States as Night Affair.

Plot
Georges Vallois (Gabin), a vice inspector for the Paris police, takes special interest in the plight of drug-addicted Lucky (Tiller), whom he considers to be more victim than criminal. Taking it upon himself to wean Lucky away from narcotics, Vallois also wins her love—and, incidentally, smashes the dope ring responsible for her addiction.

Cast
 Jean Gabin as Inspecteur Georges Vallois
 Danielle Darrieux as Thérèse Marken
 Nadja Tiller as Lucky Fridel
 Hazel Scott as Valentine Horse
 Robert Manuel as Blasco
 Robert Berri as Marquis
 Harald Wolff as Herr Fridel
 Paul Frankeur as Inspecteur Chaville
 François Chaumette as Commissioner Janin
 Louis Ducreux as Henri Marken
 Roger Hanin as Simoni
 Gabriel Gobin as Inspecteur Rocard

External links
 
 
  Le désordre et la nuit at “Cinema-francais“ (French)
 Night Affair movie review at The New York Times Last accessed: July 3, 2014.

1958 films
1958 crime films
French black-and-white films
Films set in Paris
1950s French-language films
Films with screenplays by Michel Audiard
French crime films
Films directed by Gilles Grangier
1950s French films